Munidopsis mandelai is a species of Munidopsidae that lives on the Southwest Indian Ocean Ridge around 750 meters below sea level. With a carapace that grows to 7 mm long, it is the second largest species in the genus Munidopsis.

Etymology 
Munidopsis mandelai was named after Nelson Mandela, who died the month before its discovery.

References 

Anomura
Squat lobsters